Gonoclostera is a genus of moths belonging to the family Notodontidae.

The species of this genus are found in Southeastern Asia.

Species:
 Gonoclostera aurosigna Hampson, 1895
 Gonoclostera denticulata Oberthür, 1911

References

Notodontidae
Noctuoidea genera